Thomas Ziegler (born November 24, 1980 in Arnstadt) is a German former professional road bicycle racer. In early 2008, at the age of 27, he announced that he retired from professional cycling to open a bike shop in Hannover, where he currently lives.

Palmares 

 Sachsen Tour - 1 stage (2005)
 Rapport Tour - 1 stage (2003)
 Thüringen-Rundfahrt - 1 stage (2002)
 National U23 Road Race Championship - 3rd (2002)
 National U23 Time Trial Championship - 3rd (2002)

References

External links

1980 births
Living people
People from Ilm-Kreis
German male cyclists
Cyclists from Thuringia
21st-century German people